Cubic reciprocity is a collection of theorems in elementary and algebraic  number theory that state conditions under which the congruence x3 ≡ p (mod q) is solvable; the word "reciprocity" comes from the form of the main theorem, which states that if p and q are primary numbers in the ring of Eisenstein integers, both coprime to 3, the congruence x3 ≡ p (mod q) is solvable if and only if  x3 ≡ q (mod p) is solvable.

History

Sometime before 1748 Euler made the first conjectures about the cubic residuacity of small integers, but they were not published until 1849, after his death.

Gauss's published works mention cubic residues and reciprocity three times: there is one result pertaining to cubic residues in the Disquisitiones Arithmeticae (1801). In the introduction to the fifth and sixth proofs of quadratic reciprocity (1818) he said that he was publishing these proofs because their techniques (Gauss's lemma and Gaussian sums, respectively) can be applied to cubic and biquadratic reciprocity. Finally, a footnote in the second (of two) monographs on biquadratic reciprocity (1832) states that cubic reciprocity is most easily described in the ring of Eisenstein integers.

From his diary and other unpublished sources, it appears that Gauss knew the rules for the cubic and quartic residuacity of integers by 1805, and discovered the full-blown theorems and proofs of cubic and biquadratic reciprocity around 1814. Proofs of these were found in his posthumous papers, but it is not clear if they are his or Eisenstein's.

Jacobi published several theorems about cubic residuacity in 1827, but no proofs. In his Königsberg lectures of 1836–37 Jacobi presented proofs. The first published proofs were by Eisenstein (1844).

Integers

A cubic residue (mod p) is any number congruent to the third power of an integer (mod p). If x3 ≡ a (mod p) does not have an integer solution, a is a cubic nonresidue  (mod p).

As is often the case in number theory, it is easier to work modulo prime numbers, so in this section all moduli p, q, etc., are assumed to be positive, odd primes.

We first note that if q ≡ 2 (mod 3) is a prime then every number is a cubic residue modulo q. Let q = 3n + 2; since 0 = 03 is obviously a cubic residue, assume x is not divisible by q. Then by Fermat's little theorem,

Multiplying the two congruences we have

Now substituting 3n + 2 for q we have:

Therefore, the only interesting case is when the modulus p ≡ 1 (mod 3). In this case the non-zero residue classes (mod p) can be divided into three sets, each containing (p−1)/3 numbers. Let e be a cubic non-residue. The first set is the cubic residues; the second one is e times the numbers in the first set, and the third is e2 times the numbers in the first set. Another way to describe this division is to let e be a primitive root (mod p); then the first (resp. second, third) set is the numbers whose indices with respect to this root are congruent to 0 (resp. 1, 2) (mod 3). In the vocabulary of group theory, the first set is a subgroup of index 3 of the multiplicative group  and the other two are its cosets.

Primes ≡ 1 (mod 3)

A theorem of Fermat states that every prime p ≡ 1 (mod 3) can be written as p = a2 + 3b2 and (except for the signs of a and b) this representation is unique.

Letting m = a + b and  n = a − b, we see that this is equivalent to p = m2 − mn +  n2 (which equals (n − m)2 − (n − m)n + n2 = m2 + m(n − m) + (n − m)2, so m and n are not determined uniquely). Thus,

and it is a straightforward exercise to show that exactly one of m, n, or m − n is a multiple of 3, so

and this representation is unique up to the signs of L and M.

For relatively prime integers m and n define the rational cubic residue symbol as

It is important to note that this symbol does not have the multiplicative properties of the Legendre symbol; for this, we need the true cubic character defined below.

Euler's Conjectures. Let p = a2 + 3b2 be a prime. Then the following hold:

The first two can be restated as follows. Let p be a prime that is congruent to 1 modulo 3. Then:
 2 is a cubic residue of p if and only if p = a2 + 27b2.
 3 is a cubic residue of p if and only if 4p = a2 + 243b2.

Gauss's Theorem. Let p be a positive prime such that
 
Then 

One can easily see that Gauss's Theorem implies:

Jacobi's Theorem (stated without proof). Let q ≡ p ≡ 1 (mod 6) be positive primes. Obviously both p and q are also congruent to 1 modulo 3, therefore assume: 
 
Let x be a solution of x2 ≡ −3 (mod q). Then

and we have:

Lehmer's Theorem. Let q and p be primes, with  Then:

where 

Note that the first condition implies: that any number that divides L or M is a cubic residue (mod p).

The first few examples of this are equivalent to Euler's conjectures:

Since obviously L ≡ M (mod 2), the criterion for q = 2 can be simplified as:

Martinet's theorem. Let p ≡ q ≡ 1 (mod 3) be primes,  Then

Sharifi's theorem. Let p  = 1 + 3x + 9x2 be a prime. Then any divisor of x is a cubic residue (mod p).

Eisenstein integers

Background

In his second monograph on biquadratic reciprocity, Gauss says:

The theorems on biquadratic residues gleam with the greatest simplicity and genuine beauty only when the field of arithmetic is extended to imaginary numbers, so that without restriction, the numbers of the form a + bi constitute the object of study ... we call such numbers integral complex numbers. [bold in the original]

These numbers are now called the ring of Gaussian integers, denoted by Z[i]. Note that i is a fourth root of 1.

In a footnote he adds

The theory of cubic residues must be based in a similar way on a consideration of numbers of the form a + bh where h is an imaginary root of the equation h3 = 1 ... and similarly the theory of residues of higher powers leads to the introduction of other imaginary quantities.

In his first monograph on cubic reciprocity Eisenstein developed the theory of the numbers built up from a cube root of unity; they are now  called the ring of Eisenstein integers. Eisenstein said (paraphrasing) "to investigate the properties of this ring one need only consult Gauss's work on Z[i] and modify the proofs". This is not surprising since both rings are unique factorization domains.

The "other imaginary quantities" needed for the "theory of residues of higher powers" are the rings of integers of the cyclotomic number fields; the Gaussian and Eisenstein integers are the simplest examples of these.

Facts and terminology

Let

And consider the ring of Eisenstein integers:

This is a Euclidean domain with the norm function given by:

Note that the norm is always congruent to 0 or 1 (mod 3).

 is a unique factorization domain. The primes fall into three classes:

 3 is a special case: 

Note that if  is any inert prime then:

Their factorization is given by:
 
for example

A number is primary if it is coprime to 3 and congruent to an ordinary integer modulo  which is the same as saying it is congruent to  modulo 3. Moreover, the product of two primary numbers is primary and the conjugate of a primary number is also primary.

where each  is a primary (under Eisenstein's definition) prime. And this representation is unique, up to the order of the factors.

Cubic residue character

Definition
An analogue of Fermat's little theorem is true in : if  is not divisible by a prime ,

Now assume that  so that  Or put differently  Then we can write:

for a unique unit  This unit is called the cubic residue character of  modulo  and is denoted by

Properties
The cubic residue character has formal properties similar to those of the Legendre symbol:

 If  then 
 
  where the bar denotes complex conjugation.
 The congruence  has a solution in  if and only if 
 If  are such that  then 
 The cubic character can be extended multiplicatively to composite numbers (coprime to 3) in the "denominator" in the same way the Legendre symbol is generalized into the Jacobi symbol. Like the Jacobi symbol, if the "denominator" of the cubic character is composite, then if the "numerator" is a cubic residue mod the "denominator" the symbol will equal 1, if the symbol does not equal 1 then the "numerator" is a cubic non-residue, but the symbol can equal 1 when the "numerator" is a non-residue:

where

Statement of the theorem

Let α and β be primary. Then

There are supplementary theorems for the units and the prime 1 − ω:

Let α = a + bω be primary, a = 3m + 1 and b = 3n. (If a ≡ 2 (mod 3) replace α with its associate −α; this will not change the value of the cubic characters.) Then

See also

Quadratic reciprocity
Quartic reciprocity
Octic reciprocity
Eisenstein reciprocity
Artin reciprocity

Notes

References

The references to the original papers of Euler, Jacobi, and Eisenstein were copied from the bibliographies in Lemmermeyer and Cox, and were not used in the preparation of this article.

Euler

This was actually written 1748–1750, but was only published posthumously; It is in Vol V, pp. 182–283 of

Gauss

The two monographs Gauss published on biquadratic reciprocity have consecutively numbered sections: the first contains §§ 1–23 and the second §§ 24–76. Footnotes referencing these are of the form "Gauss, BQ, § n". Footnotes referencing the Disquisitiones Arithmeticae are of the form "Gauss, DA, Art. n".

These are in Gauss's Werke, Vol II, pp. 65–92 and 93–148

Gauss's fifth and sixth proofs of quadratic reciprocity are in

This is in Gauss's Werke, Vol II, pp. 47–64

German translations of all three of the above are the following, which also has the Disquisitiones Arithmeticae and Gauss's other papers on number theory.

Eisenstein

These papers are all in Vol I of his Werke.

Jacobi

This is in Vol VI of his Werke.

Modern authors

External links
 

Algebraic number theory
Modular arithmetic
Theorems in number theory